Charles Frank Byers, Baron Byers,  (24 July 1915 – 6 February 1984) was a British Liberal Party politician who later became a life peer and Privy Councillor.

Background
Byers was born in Wallasey, Cheshire. He was the son of Charles Cecil Byers (1888–1957), a Lloyd's underwriter, who was Liberal candidate for Westbury at the 1935 general election. He moved with the family to Potters Bar and was educated at Westminster School, followed by Christ Church, Oxford, where he won a Blue for athletics.  At Oxford he was president of the Union of Liberal Students and president of the University Liberal Club.  His treasurer was Harold Wilson, later Labour Party prime minister.

Byers was also an exchange scholar at Milton Academy, Massachusetts. While at the University of Oxford, where he gained his degree in Philosophy, Politics and Economics, he met Joan Oliver, whom he married in 1939. They had a son and three daughters. Joan Oliver was a committed Liberal in her own right and was a constant help to her husband during his political career.

Byers was admitted to Gray's Inn after university, but broke off his legal education to enlist. During the Second World War, Byers served in the Royal Artillery, rising to the rank of lieutenant-colonel and for a time serving on Field Marshal Montgomery's staff.  He was mentioned in dispatches three times, was created a Chevalier of the Legion of Honour, and was awarded the Croix de Guerre. In 1944 he was appointed an Officer of the Order of the British Empire.

In the 1945 general election, Byers gained the formerly Conservative seat of North Dorset, with the absence of a Labour candidate being a key factor in this success. In 1946 Byers was appointed Liberal Chief Whip and gained a reputation for hard work and effective organisation both in parliament and at Liberal Party headquarters. However he was unable to hold the seat in 1950, losing by just 97 votes to the Conservatives following Labour's decision to stand a candidate. He unsuccessfully tried to re-enter the House of Commons in 1960 at the Bolton East by-election.

On 22 December 1964 Byers was created a life peer as Baron Byers, of Lingfield in the County of Surrey and three years later he became leader of the Liberal peers. He was created a Privy Councillor in 1972.

Outside Parliament, Byers was a businessman, a director of Rio Tinto Zinc from 1962–73 and a broadcaster. He died of a heart attack on 6 February 1984. A memorial service was held in Westminster Abbey on 5 April 1984. His daughter Louise married Dipak Nandy, an Indian academic and politician. Louise's daughter, Lisa Nandy, is a Labour MP.

References

Further reading

External links 
 

Alumni of Christ Church, Oxford
British Army personnel of World War II
Chevaliers of the Légion d'honneur
Deputy Lieutenants of Surrey
Liberal Party (UK) MPs for English constituencies
Liberal Party (UK) life peers
Members of Gray's Inn
Members of the Privy Council of the United Kingdom
Officers of the Order of the British Empire
1915 births
1984 deaths
People educated at Westminster School, London
Recipients of the Croix de Guerre 1939–1945 (France)
Royal Artillery officers
UK MPs 1945–1950
UK MPs who were granted peerages
Members of the Parliament of the United Kingdom for constituencies in Dorset
People from Wallasey
Chairs of the Liberal Party (UK)
Life peers created by Elizabeth II